Robert Gravem Webb (18 February 1927 – 18 September 2018) was an American herpetologist, expert in the systematics and biogeography of reptiles and amphibians, and professor emeritus of biological science at the University of Texas, El Paso.

Webb received his Ph.D. in zoology from the University of Kansas in 1960.

Webb had over a hundred publications to his name. He specialized in amphibians and reptiles of the southwestern United States and Mexico.

The snake Lampropeltis webbi is named after him.

References

1927 births
2018 deaths
American herpetologists
American taxonomists
20th-century American zoologists
21st-century American zoologists